The  is a rail line located in Imizu and Takaoka, Toyama Prefecture, Japan, operated by Manyosen.

Line data
Total distance: 4.9 km
Gauge: 1,067 mm
Stations: 8
Double track sections: none (entire line is single-track)
Electrified sections: Entire track (600 V DC)
Closing method: Automatic

Stations
Rokudōji Station
Shōgawaguchi Station
Nishi Shinminato Station
Shinmachiguchi Station
Naka Shinminato Station
Higashi Shinminato Station
Kaiōmaru Station
Koshinokata Station (main station)

Connecting lines
The Takaoka Kidō Line connects at Rokudōji Station.

References

transit website. https://www.manyosen.co.jp/

Rail transport in Toyama Prefecture
Railway lines in Japan